Barguzinsky District (Bargajanai aimag) is an administrative and municipal district (raion), one of the twenty-one in the Republic of Buryatia, Russia. It is located in the northeast of the republic. Its administrative center is the rural locality (a selo) of Barguzin. As of the 2010 Census, the total population of the district was 23,598, with the population of Barguzin accounting for 24.2% of that number.

Geography
The district is situated at the mouth of the Barguzin River within the Barguzin Valley.

In floodplain areas and terraces, the Barguzin River and its tributaries are characterized by the alternation of a mosaic of meadow steppe, steppe, and wetland spaces. Forest vegetation prevails in the foothill areas and on the slopes of the rivers, up to  altitude. The forests are rich in berries, mushrooms, and nuts.

History
The district was established on December 23, 1923.

Administrative and municipal status
Within the framework of administrative divisions, Barguzinsky District is one of the twenty-one in the Republic of Buryatia. It is divided into one urban-type settlement (an administrative division with the administrative center in the urban-type settlement (an inhabited locality) of Ust-Barguzin), six selsoviets, and three somons, which comprise thirty-three rural localities. As a municipal division, the district is incorporated as Barguzinsky Municipal District. The urban-type settlement is incorporated as an urban settlement, and the six selsoviets and three somons are incorporated as nine rural settlements within the municipal district. The selo of Barguzin serves as the administrative center of both the administrative and municipal district.

References

Notes

Sources

Districts of Buryatia
States and territories established in 1923
1923 establishments in the Soviet Union